Jabi is a state constituency in Terengganu, Malaysia. It is currently represented in the Terengganu State Legislative Assembly.

The state constituency was first contested in 1986 and is mandated to return a single Assemblyman to the Terengganu State Legislative Assembly under the first-past-the-post voting system. , the State Assemblyman for Jabi is Azman Ibrahim from the Parti Islam Se-Malaysia (PAS), which is part of the state's ruling coalition, Perikatan Nasional (PN).

Definition 
Jabi constituency is located under Setiu federal constituency. The Jabi constituency contains the polling districts of Apal, Kuala Kubang, Tanah Merah, Bukit Jeruk (or Bukit Jerok), Tok Dor, Tempinis, Renek, Jabi, and Kerandang.

Demographic

History

Election results

References

Terengganu state constituencies